Davies is a patronymic surname of Welsh origin. There are two main theories concerning its beginnings, neither of which has been definitively proven. The first theory states that it may be a corruption of "Dyfed", the name of a medieval Welsh kingdom located in what is now Carmarthenshire; however, the origin of the kingdom's name is itself disputed, with the traditional belief being that it was founded by the powerful Irish Déisi dynasty in the third century, or otherwise that it derives from the name of the Demetae people. "Dyfed" as a surname and the related first name "Dafydd" appear from the 12th century, with the latter generally translated into English as "David". The second theory contends that the surname may derive directly from the Hebrew name "David", which is also the name of Wales' patron saint.

The surname is the joint-second most common in Wales (tied with Williams) and the eighth most common in England, where a large percentage of people have Welsh ancestry. It is particularly widespread in southwest England, especially Cornwall, and in northwest England, large parts of which are on the border with Wales. It is uncommon in the United States, where the variant "Davis" is seen more. In the United Kingdom, the surname is usually pronounced the same as "Davis".

Notable people with the surname

A 
 Aaron Michael Davies (born 1984), American actor
 Adam Davies (disambiguation), multiple people
 A. Donald Davies, American Episcopal bishop
 Adrian Davies (barrister), English barrister
 Adrian Davies (rugby player), Welsh rugby footballer
 Adrienne Davies, American musician
 Alan Davies (disambiguation), multiple people
 Alec Davies, Scottish cricketer
 Alex Davies (disambiguation), multiple people
 Alexandra Davies (born 1977), English-born Australian actress
Alice Davies (1870 – after 1919),  British suffragette and nurse
 Alphonso Davies (born 2000), Ghanaian-born Canadian soccer player
 Alfred Davies (disambiguation), multiple people
 Alun Davies (disambiguation), multiple people
 Andrew Davies (disambiguation), multiple people
 Anne Davies (disambiguation), or Ann Davies, multiple people
 Anthony Davies, Welsh snooker player
 Antony Davies, American economist
 Arthur Davies (disambiguation), multiple people
 Ashley Slanina-Davies, English actress

B
 Barbara Davies, English teacher and activist
 Barry Davies, English sports commentator
 Benjamin Davies (disambiguation), multiple people
 Bevan Davies, American drummer
 Billie Davies, American drummer
 Billy Davies, Scottish football manager
 Bob Davies, American basketball player
 Brandon Davies, American basketball player
 Brenda Davies (1917–2013), wife and literary executor of Robertson Davies
 Brian Davies, philosopher
 Brian Davies, birth name of British illustrator and cartoonist Michael ffolkes
 Bryan Davies (disambiguation), multiple people
 Bryn Davies, British trade unionist and politician

C
 Caitlin Davies, English writer
 Carrie Davies, British broadcaster
 Charles Lynn Davies, Wales rugby player
 Charlie Davies, American footballer
 Chris Davies (disambiguation), multiple people
 Christopher Davies (disambiguation), multiple people
 Clara Novello Davies, Welsh singer, mother of Ivor Novello
 Clement Davies, British politician
Clement L. Davies, Canadian Christian minister and Ku Klux Klan supporter
 Cliff Davies (disambiguation), multiple people
 Cooke Davies, Canadian politician
 Curtis Davies, English footballer
 Cyril Davies, English musician

D
 Dai Davies (disambiguation), multiple people
 Dangerous Davies, fictional character from The Last Detective
 Dave Davies (disambiguation), multiple people
 David Davies (disambiguation), multiple people
 Deddie Davies (1938–2016), Welsh character actress
 Denys Johnson-Davies, Canadian translator
 Denzil Davies, British politician
 Diana Davies (disambiguation), multiple people
 Dick Davies (1936–2012), American Olympic basketball player
 Dickie Davies (1928–2023), English television presenter
 Domenick Davies, German rugby union international
 Donald Davies (disambiguation), multiple people

E
 Ebenezer Thomas Davies (1903–1991), scholar and priest
 Ednyfed Hudson Davies (1929–2018), Welsh politician
 Edward Davies (disambiguation), multiple people
 Edwin Davies, British businessman and philanthropist
 Edwin Davies (publisher) (1859–1919), Welsh publisher and editor
 Emiko Davies, Australian-born food writer 
 Emily Davies, English feminist
 Eric Davies, South African cricketer
 Eva Davies (1924–2013), British fencer
 Evan Thomas Davies (1878–1969), Welsh composer

F
 Frances Davies (born 1996), New Zealand field hockey player
 Fred Davies (1939–2020), English footballer
 Freddie Davies (born 1937), English comedian

G
 Gareth Davies (disambiguation), multiple people
 Garfield Davies, Baron Davies of Coity (1935–2019), British trade union leader
 Gary Davies (disambiguation),  multiple people
 Gavyn Davies, British banker and past BBC chairman
 Geoffrey Davies, English actor
 George Davies (disambiguation), multiple people
 Geraint Davies (disambiguation), multiple people
 Gerald Davies Welsh rugby player
 Gordon Leslie Herries Davies (1932–2019), British geographer and historian of geography and geology
 Grant Davies, Australian canoer
 Greg Davies, English comedian
 Godfrey Davies, English historian
 Gwen Ffrangcon-Davies, English actress

H
 Henry Davies (disambiguation), multiple people
Hilary Davies (born 1954), English poet, critic and translator
 Hopkin Davies, Wales international rugby player
 Howard Davies (disambiguation), multiple people
 Hugh Sykes Davies (1909–1984), English poet and academic
 Hunter Davies, Scottish writer
 Huw Irranca-Davies, British politician

I
 Ian Davies (disambiguation), multiple people
 Idris Davies, Welsh poet

J
 J. Glyn Davies, Welsh poet and scholar
 Jack Davies (disambiguation), several people
 Jack Llewelyn Davies, see Llewelyn Davies
 Jackson Davies, Canadian actor
 Jacob G. Davies (1795–1857), American politician
 James Davies (disambiguation), multiple people
 Jeremy Davies (exorcist), English Catholic priest
 Jeremy Davies, American actor
 Jérémy Davies, Canadian ice hockey player
 Jim Davies (disambiguation), multiple people
 Jimmy Davies, American racing driver
 Jocelyn Davies, Welsh politician
 Joe Davies (disambiguation)
 John Davies (disambiguation), multiple people
 Jon Davies, American meteorologist and storm chaser
 Jonathan Davies (disambiguation), multiple people
 Joseph Davies (disambiguation), multiple people

K
 Karl Davies, English television actor
 Kay Davies, English geneticist
 Ken Davies (disambiguation), multiple people
 Kevin Davies, English footballer
 Kevin Davies, British television director
 Kieron Davies, German rugby union player
 Kimberley Davies, Australian actress
 Kyle Davies, American baseball player
 Kyle Davies, American soccer player

L
 L. P. Davies, British novelist
 Lane Davies, American actor
 Laura Davies, English golfer
 Libby Davies, Canadian politician
 Lilian May Davies, later Princess Lilian, Duchess of Halland
 Lindy Davies, Australian actress
 Llewellyn Alberic Emilius Price-Davies, British general
 Lorys Davies, British Anglican priest
 Louis Henry Davies, Canadian politician
 Luke Davies, Australian writer
 Lyndal Davies, Australian wildlife documentary maker
 Lynn Davies, British athlete

M
 M. C. Davies (1835–1913), Australian businessman
 Mandy Rice-Davies (1944–2014), Welsh model
 Marcus Davies (born 1991), Australian rules footballer
 Marianne Davies, English musician
 Marion Davies (1897–1961), American actress
 Mark Davies (disambiguation), multiple people
 Marshall Davies (born 1930), American musician; pianist, professor
 Martin Davies (disambiguation), multiple people
 Mary Elizabeth Davies (1925–2015), Welsh chess master
 Matthew Davies (disambiguation), multiple people
 Mervyn Davies (1946–2012), Welsh rugby player
 Michael Davies (disambiguation), multiple people
 Mike Davies (disambiguation), multiple people
 Mims Davies (born 1975), British Conservative politician, MP for Eastleigh since 2015 
 A. Morley Davies (1869–1959), British paleontologist

N
 Nicholas Barry Davies, British ethologist, ornithologist and professor at the University of Cambridge
 Nicholas Llewelyn Davies, see Llewelyn Davies
 Nick Davies, British journalist
 Nicola Davies (disambiguation), multiple people
 Norman Davies, English historian

O
 Oliver Ford Davies, English actor
 Owen Davies (disambiguation), multiple people

P
 Patricia Davies, Zimbabwean field hockey player
 Paul Davies (disambiguation), multiple people
 Peter Davies (disambiguation), multiple people
 Peter Ho Davies, English author
 Peter Llewelyn Davies, see Llewelyn Davies
 Peter Maxwell Davies (1934–2016), English composer
 Philip Davies, British politician
 Philip R. Davies, British scholar
 A. Powell Davies, American Unitarian Minister

Q
 Quentin Davies, British politician

R
 R.E.G. Davies, English scholar and aviation writer
 Ray Davies, English musician and member of The Kinks
 Reine Davies, American actress
 Rees Davies, Welsh historian
 Rhett Davies, producer
 Rhys Davies (disambiguation), multiple people
 Richard Davies (disambiguation), multiple people
 Richard Gareth Davies, English entomologist
 Rick Davies, English musician with Supertramp
 Robert Davies (disambiguation), multiple people
 Rob Davies (disambiguation), multiple people
 Robertson Davies, Canadian author
 Robin Davies (1954–2010), Welsh actor
 Roger Davies (disambiguation), multiple people
 Ron Davies (disambiguation), multiple people
 Ronald Davies (disambiguation), multiple people
 Rosemary Davies, American actress
 Rosina Davies (1863–1949), Welsh evangelist
 Roy Davies (disambiguation), multiple people
 Rupert Davies, English actor
 Russell Davies, Welsh television personality
 Russell T Davies, Welsh television writer
 Ryan Davies, Welsh entertainer

S
 Sally Davies (disambiguation), multiple people
 Sam Davies (disambiguation), multiple people
 Samuel Davies (disambiguation), multiple people
 Sara Davies (born 1984), British businesswoman
 Sarah Davies (disambiguation), multiple people
 Scott Davies (disambiguation), multiple people
 Sean Davies (born 1973), Zimbabwean cricketer
 Sean Davies (footballer) (born 1985), English footballer
 Sharron Davies (born 1962), English swimmer
 Shona Rapira Davies, New Zealand artist
 Siobhan Davies, English dancer
 Simon Davies (disambiguation), multiple people
 S. O. Davies, British politician
 Sonja Davies, New Zealand trade unionist and politician
 Stan Davies (1898–1972), Welsh international footballer
 Stephen Davies (disambiguation), multiple people
 Steven Davies, English cricketer
 Stevie Davies, Welsh novelist
 Stewart Davies, English football chairman
 Stuart Davies (rugby union) (born 1965), Welsh rugby union player
 Sue Jones-Davies, Welsh actress and singer 
 Sylvia Llewelyn Davies (1866–1910), mother of the boys who served as the inspiration for Peter Pan

T
 T. Glynne Davies, Welsh poet and broadcaster
 Terence Davies, English film director
 Theophilus Harris Davies, British businessman
 Thomas Davies (disambiguation), includes Tom Davies
 Tim Davies (disambiguation)
 Tod Davies, American screenwriter
 Trefor Davies, Welsh cricketer
 Tru Davies, fictional eponymous character in Tru Calling

V
 Valentine Davies, American film director
 Vanessa Lloyd-Davies (1960–2005), British doctor, equestrian and soldier

W
 W. H. Davies, Welsh poet and writer
 W. P. C. Davies, English rugby player and headmaster
 W. R. Davies, second president (1941–1959) of the University of Wisconsin-Eau Claire
 Walford Davies, English composer
 William Davies (disambiguation), multiple people
 William Rupert Davies, former Canadian senator
 Windsor Davies (1930–2019), English actor

Z
 Zach Davies, American baseball player

See also
Davis (disambiguation), a placename and surname, among other uses
Davies-Gilbert
Baron Davies
Llewelyn Davies, the family closely connected with J. M. Barrie's Peter Pan

Notes

References

English-language surnames
Hebrew-language surnames
Surnames of Welsh origin
Anglicised Welsh-language surnames
Anglo-Cornish surnames
Patronymic surnames
Surnames from given names